Robert Lemieux (born December 16, 1944) is a Canadian former professional ice hockey defenceman and coach. He played 19 games for the Oakland Seals of the National Hockey League (NHL) in 1967–68. He was a First Team All-Star and was named the top defenceman of the International Hockey League in 1965–66 while playing with the Muskegon Zephyrs. He played three seasons with the Western Hockey League's Vancouver Canucks before retiring in 1970. After retiring he coached in the minor leagues for several years, finishing in 1978.

Career statistics

Regular season and playoffs

References

External links

1944 births
Living people
Canadian ice hockey coaches
Canadian ice hockey defencemen
Houston Apollos players
Montreal Junior Canadiens players
Oakland Seals players
Seattle Totems (WHL) players
Ice hockey people from Montreal
Vancouver Canucks (WHL) players